Delavan Leonard Pierson (1867–1952) was an American Presbyterian pastor, Christian leader, editor and writer. He was educated at Princeton University (B.A., 1890; M.A., 1894) and Princeton Theological Seminary (B.D., 1894), and was licensed by the Presbytery of New Brunswick in 1894. He was the first son of Arthur Tappan Pierson who was an American Presbyterian pastor, Christian Leader, and missionary to Korea where A. T. Pierson established the Pierson Memorial Bible School (now Pyeongtaek University) in Seoul in 1912.  He had a distinguished career as a writer and as a Bible school superintendent, and was editor of The Northfield Echoes and of The Missionary Review of the World.

External links
 Reformed Reader article
 The Arthur Tappan and Delavan Leonard Pierson Manuscript Collection Princeton Theological Seminary

American evangelicals
Presbyterian Church in the United States of America ministers
American sermon writers
1867 births
1952 deaths